Estero Hondo Es un pueblo de Puerto Plata, Republica Dominicana con seis parajes, conocida por sus playas de arenas coralinas y aguas claras, como playa Puerto Coral o El Pato, El Buren, La Ensenada y Punta Rucia. Además cuenta con el parque nacional Santuario de Manatíes de Estero Hondo.

Tambien es un pueblo histórico por la expedición militar del 14 de junio de 1959 dirigida por Enrique Jiménez moya

Sources 
World Gazeteer: Dominican Republic – World-Gazetteer.com

Comunidad de personas cuyos miembros están vinculados por un sentido de solidaridad, pueblo conocido historicamente por la expedición militar antitrujillista de junio de 1959 y su playa La Ensenada.

Populated places in Puerto Plata Province